Thổ Chu Islands is an archipelago in the Gulf of Thailand. It constitutes Tho Chau Commune of Phú Quốc District, Kiên Giang Province, Vietnam.

Geography

Thổ Chu Islands consist of eight islands as following: Thổ Chu Island, Hòn Cao, Hòn Cao Cát, Hòn Khô, Hòn Mô (or Hòn Cái Bàn), Hòn Nhạn, Hòn Từ and Hòn Xanh. Hòn Nhạn is base point A1 on Vietnam's baseline.

Biodiversity
Thổ Chu Island - the largest entity of the archipelago - was first proposed to become a marine protected area in 1995.

History
During the era of Republic of Vietnam, Thổ Chu Islands were under the administration of An Xuyên Province. However, the islands historically used to constitute a disputed territory between Cambodia and Vietnam, both nations claiming that they are within their territorial waters.

On May 10, 1975, Khmer Rouge occupied Thổ Chu Island and abducted about five hundred civilians to Cambodia, all of whom were massacred. From May 24 to May 27, 1975, Vietnamese forces attacked the occupiers and recaptured the island. In 1977, the Khmer Rouge raided Thổ Chu Island once again but were defeated.

On April 27, 1992, under the arrangement of the People's Committee of Kiên Giang Province, six families with about thirty people moved to Thổ Chu Island and settled there. On April 24, 1993, the Vietnamese government decided to establish Thổ Châu Commune.

On March 8, 2014, Malaysia Airlines Flight 370 lost contact with ground while flying by this island.

Demography and economy
Thổ Châu commune has about 500 households with nearly 2,000 inhabitants, most of whom are border guards and navy personnel who chose to settle on the islands; the rest are immigrants. Local residents' livelihood is providing service to fishing boats, small craft production, farming, animal husbandry and fishing along the coast.

See also
List of islands of Vietnam
Phú Quốc Island

External links
Tho Chu Islands Travel Guide

References

Landforms of Kiên Giang province
Archipelagoes of Vietnam
Islands of the Gulf of Thailand